Jamesonite is a sulfosalt mineral, a lead, iron, antimony sulfide with formula Pb4FeSb6S14. With the addition of manganese it forms a series with benavidesite. It is a dark grey metallic mineral which forms acicular prismatic monoclinic crystals. It is soft with a Mohs hardness of 2.5 and has a specific gravity of 5.5 - 5.6. It is one of the few sulfide minerals to form fibrous or needle like crystals.  It can also form large prismatic crystals similar to stibnite with which it can be associated. It is usually found in low to moderate temperature hydrothermal deposits.

It was named for Scottish mineralogist Robert Jameson (1774–1854). It was first identified in 1825 in Cornwall, England. It is also reported from South Dakota and Arkansas, US; Zacatecas, Mexico; and Romania.

References

External links
Mineral galleries

Lead minerals
Iron(II) minerals
Sulfosalt minerals
Monoclinic minerals
Minerals in space group 14